Pokrovka is a rural locality (a khutor) in Pervomayskoye Rural Settlement, Podgorensky District, Voronezh Oblast, Russia. The population was 54 as of 2010.

Geography 
Pokrovka is located 12 km south of Podgorensky (the district's administrative centre) by road. Sud-Nikolayevka is the nearest rural locality.

References 

Rural localities in Podgorensky District